Alexander Victorovich Donskoy is a former mayor of the Northern Russian city of Arkhangelsk. He was the first Russian politician of national recognition who proclaimed intentions to run for the presidency in 2008. After announcing his intentions in 2006, he was arrested in July 2007 following charges of economic crimes and abuse of office. He was released in March 2008 after receiving a sentence of 3 years on probation.

Political career and persecution
Donskoy is an entrepreneur, with interests in the supermarket, according to at least to one source. He was elected as mayor of Arhangelsk in March 2005, reportedly the youngest mayor of the city to date. His announcement on November 1, 2006 of the intention to run for the presidency of Russia was followed and allegedly anticipated by official pressure. He became the subject of a criminal investigation toward the end of 2006 and, in early 2007, was accused of abuse of office and of forging a university diploma. Following his subsequent arrest, he was released, but was arrested for the second time in July 2007. As of early October, Donskoy remained in pre-trial detention, with the third of three cases awaiting hearing. At least two sources reported that Donskoy had been handed a suspended sentence (of one year) for charges related to "faking documents" and "illegal business activity." It is not clear whether this result constituted sentences associated with two prosecuted cases or one. Prosecutors are seeking restrictions on future political activity as part of the judgment following the third trial. Supporters maintain his innocence and propose political causes for his continued prosecution.

In 2006, Donskoy raised money to buy out buildings constructed by a Romani group and reached an agreement with baron Holupy Gomon to move the group out.

2018 presidential campaign

On October 24, 2017, Donskoy announced that he would run for President in the 2018 election.

Personal life
Alexander Donskoy came out on October 24, 2017. Answering a journalist's question about whether or not he was gay, he said yes. Later Alexander Donskoy confirmed that this was the official statement.

In 2017 Donskoy took his Ferrari and sped it through the halls of a mall in Moscow on a Monday morning.  Nobody was injured but it took security officers several minutes to stop the car, allowing it to leave several tire tracks along the floor of the mall.  When asked why he did this he said it was for fun and as a joke for publicity.

Trivia

On January 2, 2019, a video was uploaded to YouTube of Donskoy racing around the mall in Moscow set to the tune of Coconut Mall from the Mario Kart series.  It went viral and has amassed over 2.2 million views.

References

External links
The fate that befalls critics who dare to stand up to Putin

Mayors of Arkhangelsk
Living people
Gay politicians
LGBT mayors
Russian LGBT politicians
1970 births
21st-century LGBT people